Aspres-lès-Corps (literally Aspres near Corps) is a commune of the Hautes-Alpes department in southeastern France.

Population

See also
Communes of the Hautes-Alpes department

References

Communes of Hautes-Alpes
Dauphiné